WaveLab is a digital audio editor and recording computer software application for Windows and macOS, created by Steinberg. WaveLab was started in 1995 and it is mainly the work of one programmer, Philippe Goutier.

Audio can be edited as a single file, a series of files or a multitrack "montage". It fully supports VST 2 and 3 plugins for audio processing. Cut-down versions of WaveLab are available as WaveLab Elements and WaveLab LE.

Features and usage
In addition to recording audio from multiple sources, WaveLab can be used for post-processing of all types of audio. It is popularly used for mastering audio, but also facilitates basic usage such as editing podcasts.
 Single-window dockable user interface with multiple themes, fully scalable
 Maximum sample rate of 384 kHz and bit depth of 32-bit floating point
 Encodes, imports and allows editing metadata of various file formats such as WAV, FLAC, OGG, AIFF, MP3 and AAC
 DDP (Disc Description Protocol) and included shareable DDP Player
 Offline loudness analysis (EBU-compliant)
 Extensive batch processing features and scripting
 Render button to render changes to sound files while they are playing
 Spectrum Editor with various display settings and editing tools
 "Audio Inpainting" to recreate missing content by analyzing the surrounding area
 Visualizers such as a spectrometer, phase scope and wave scope
 Real-time spectrogram for playback and monitored signals
 Mid/Side viewing, processing and editing
 Modern time-stretching and pitch-shifting algorithms
 Folder watching for automatic offline processing
 Full integration of external effects hardware
 Master Section with effect slots, re-sampling, master level, final effects/dithering, playback processing and speaker configuration
 Direct exchange and ASIO driver sharing with Cubase and Nuendo
 Various effects and processors including the MasterRig and RestoreRig plug-in bundles, and offline processors

See also
Steinberg Cubase
Nuendo

References

External links
 Steinberg - The software company that developed WaveLab
 Steinberg Wavelab v2 Sound On Sound review (archive.org)
Steinberg offers free versions of Cubase WaveLab and more in its #StayHome Elements bundle

Digital audio workstation software
Soundtrack creation software